Dmitry Viktorovich Lipartov (born 2 April 1973) is a former Russian professional footballer who played as a striker.

External links
 Player profile on www.fctrans.ee

1973 births
Living people
Footballers from Saint Petersburg
Russian footballers
JK Sillamäe Kalev players
Expatriate footballers in Estonia
Russian expatriate footballers
Expatriate footballers in China
JK Narva Trans players
FC Slavyansk Slavyansk-na-Kubani players
Association football forwards